Tuivasa is a Samoan surname. Notable people with the surname include:

Roger Tuivasa-Sheck (born 1993), Samoan-born New Zealand rugby league footballer
Tai Tuivasa (born 1993), Australian mixed martial artist

Samoan-language surnames